Bryant DeJuan Crawford (born March 21, 1997) is an American professional basketball player for Igokea of the Bosnian League, the Adriatic League and the Basketball Champions League. He played college basketball for Wake Forest University, where he was named All-ACC Honorable Mention in 2018.

Early life and college career
Crawford attended Gonzaga College High School in Washington, where he averaged 13.1 points, 5.5 assists, 3.7 rebounds and 2.2 steals per game. On March 20, 2015, Crawford was named D.C. Gatorade Player of the Year.

Crawford played three years at Wake Forest University, where led the Demon Deacons in scoring (16.9 ppg), assists (152), 3-pointers (57), free throw percentage (86.8%) and steals (48) in his junior year. He became one of five ACC players to have at least 400 points and 125 assists as a freshman, sophomore and junior. Crawford ended his career ranked in the Wake Forest top 10 in career assists (7th-467), career 3-pointers (8th-167) and career steals (9th-149). Crawford also ranks in the top 25 in Wake Forest career scoring (23rd-1,470). On March 4, 2018, Crawford was named Honorable Mention All-ACC.

On May 29, 2018, after completing his junior year at Wake Forest, Crawford announced his plans to graduate and depart for a professional career.

Professional career

Hapoel Gilboa Galil (2018–2019)
After going undrafted in the 2018 NBA draft, Crawford joined the Brooklyn Nets for the 2018 NBA Summer League.

On August 6, 2018, Crawford signed with the Israeli team Hapoel Gilboa Galil for the 2018–19 season. On October 21, Crawford recorded a season-high 25 points, shooting 9-of-12 from the field, along with three rebounds, three assists and six steals in an 86–76 win over Hapoel Tel Aviv. He was subsequently named Israeli League Round 3 MVP. On November 5, Crawford recorded 20 points, along with six rebounds, nine assists and four steals, leading Gilboa Galil to a 98–94 win over Maccabi Tel Aviv. He was subsequently named Israeli League Round 5 MVP. In 22 games played for Gilboa Galil, he averaged 15.3 points, 2.4 rebounds, 4.8 assists and 2.1 steals per game.

Juventus Utena (2019–2021)
On August 14, 2019, Crawford signed a one-year deal with Juventus Utena of the Lithuanian Basketball League. He averaged 12.3 points per game. Crawford re-signed with the team on August 11, 2020.

Reggio Emilia (2021–2022)
On July 12, 2021, Crawford sign a two years contract with exit option after one year with Reggio Emilia in the Italian Lega Basket Serie A.

Career statistics

College

|-
| style="text-align:left;"| 2015–16
| style="text-align:left;"| Wake Forest
| 30 || 30 || 31.7 || .394 || .348 || .669 || 3.0 || 4.4 || 1.7 || .2 || 13.7
|-
| style="text-align:left;"| 2016–17
| style="text-align:left;"| Wake Forest
| 33 || 33 || 31.8 || .438 || .346 || .826 || 3.8 || 5.5 || 1.4 || .2 || 16.1
|-
| style="text-align:left;"| 2017–18
| style="text-align:left;"| Wake Forest
| 31 || 30 || 31.8 || .413 || .358 || .868 || 2.9 || 4.9 || 1.5 || .1 || 16.8
|-
|- class="sortbottom"
| style="text-align:center;" colspan="2" | Career
| 94 || 93 || 31.8 || .416 || .351 || .799 || 3.2 || 4.9 || 1.5 || .2 || 15.6

Source: RealGM

References

External links
 Wake Forest Demon Deacons bio
 RealGM profile

1997 births
Living people
American expatriate basketball people in Israel
American expatriate basketball people in Italy
American expatriate basketball people in Lithuania
American men's basketball players
Basketball players from Maryland
BC Juventus players
Gonzaga College High School alumni
Hapoel Gilboa Galil Elyon players
Pallacanestro Reggiana players
People from Silver Spring, Maryland
Point guards
Sportspeople from Montgomery County, Maryland
Wake Forest Demon Deacons men's basketball players